Long Lost Family Australia is an Australian television series on Network Ten which premiered on 16 March 2016. It is based on Dutch format Spoorloos developed by broadcaster KRO, who sold it to the UK, where it was called Long Lost Family, a BAFTA award-winning British television series that has aired on ITV since 2011. Presented by Chrissie Swan and Anh Do and featuring private investigator Julia Robson, it aims to reunite close relatives after years of separation. It is made by the production company WTFN.

In a February 2017 interview, Ten's Chief Content Officer Beverley McGarvey confirmed there were no plans to air further seasons of the program.

Series Summary

References

2010s Australian documentary television series
2016 Australian television series debuts
Television series about family history
Network 10 original programming
English-language television shows
2016 Australian television series endings